Anthony Neely (born May 20, 1986) is an American-Taiwanese singer and actor. His father is of Euro-American descent and his mother is Taiwanese. In 2009, Neely participated in popular singing competition One Million Star (Season 5) as a PK (Player Kill) challenger. His performances created sensations after receiving full marks of 25 points on three occasions, and also being the first in the reality show's history to score a record 33 out of 25 points.

Early years
Neely double-majored in psychology and theatre studies at the University of California, San Diego (UCSD). He is bilingual in English and Mandarin Chinese. Neely grew up in the San Francisco Bay Area in a small suburb, Millbrae, California. He graduated from Burlingame High School in 2004.

Career
Neely performed Hsiao Huang-chi's "You Are My Eyes" (你是我的眼) during his first performance in One Million Star. He said that he did not really understand the meaning behind the lyrics of the song, but was touched by the melody and performed it according to his own feelings. One of the judges of the competition, Phil Chang, was greatly touched by the performance, and praised Neely's rendition for "having a different style from the original singer."

Among his many performances during the singing competition, one stood out: an acoustic version of Damien Rice’s "The Blower's Daughter". Host Matilda Tao then announced to the judges that if the given five points were not enough, they could raise up one hand to represent one point or stand up to represent ten points. Judge Kay Huang stood up, while judges Phil Chang and Roger raised both hands and one hand respectively, giving Neely a total of 33 marks out of the original 25 points any contestant can get.

Personal life
Neely's mother was born in Taiwan, while his maternal grandparents are from Liaoning, China.

In September 2014, Neely revealed that he had married in 2010 and that his wife, Vivi Lee, had given birth to a daughter the year after. The news was revealed in a YouTube video titled "Anthony Neely's True Confession", which was uploaded to his personal YouTube profile on his daughter's third birthday. He officially divorced from his wife in March 2018, over a year after he admitted to infidelity.

Discography

Studio albums
Lesson One (2010)
Wake Up (2012)
Friends (2013)

Singles

Theatre

References

External links
 
 
 

1986 births
Living people
American male actors of Chinese descent
American male actors of Taiwanese descent
American musicians of Chinese descent
American musicians of Taiwanese descent
People from Millbrae, California
One Million Star contestants
Taiwanese male singer-songwriters
21st-century Taiwanese male singers
21st-century Taiwanese male actors
Taiwanese male film actors
Taiwanese male television actors
Taiwanese male stage actors
Taiwanese people of American descent
American male film actors
American male television actors
American male stage actors
21st-century American male actors
21st-century American musicians
21st-century American male singers
21st-century American singers
American male singer-songwriters
Singer-songwriters from California